Chia-Shun Yih (July 25, 1918 – April 25, 1997) was the Stephen P. Timoshenko Distinguished University Professor Emeritus at the University of Michigan. He made many significant contributions to fluid mechanics. Yih was also a seal artist.

Biography
Yih was born on July 25, 1918 in Guiyang, Guizhou province of China. Yih received his junior middle school education in Zhenjiang, and entered Suzhou High School in 1934 in Suzhou, Jiangsu Province.

In 1937, Yih entered the National Central University (After 1949 named Nanjing University in Jiangsu of P.R.China; after 1952, its engineering faculty formed the Southeast University also in Nanjing) and studied civil engineering. Yih graduated in 1941 then did research at a hydrodynamics laboratory in Guanxian (or Guan County; 灌县; current Dujiangyan) of Sichuan province. Yih also worked in a bridge construction company in Guizhou. Later, Yih taught at Guizhou University.

In 1945, Yih went to study at the University of Iowa in the United States, where he obtained his PhD in 1948. Yih served as a professor of the University of Michigan for most of his academic career.

Yih is also well known for his high language talent, which appeared already when he was just a high school student. In his first classes in high school, he could talk fluently with his American English teacher. Yih mastered German soon after he joined the college, and was able to communicate smoothly with the local German missionaries in Chongqing. Later Yih again learned French, and lectured mechanics in French at the University of Paris and the University of Grenoble.

He died on April 25, 1997 of heart failure, in his sleep, while in an airplane over Japan.

Honors and awards
Theodore von Kármán Medal, 1981
Fluid Dynamics Prize, from the American Physical Society, 1985
Otto Laporte Award, 1989

Yih was a Member of the National Academy of Engineering, and an Academician of the Academia Sinica.

Books
C.-S. Yih, Fluid Mechanics: A Concise Introduction to Theory, West River Press, Ann Arbor (1979).
C.-S. Yih, Stratified Flows, 2nd ed., Academic Press (1980).
C.-S. Yih, Fluid Mechanics, West River Press, Ann Arbor (1988).
C.-S. Yih (Ed.), Advances in Applied Mechanics, Academic Press (1982).

References

Fluid dynamicists
1918 births
1997 deaths
Chinese emigrants to the United States
People from Guiyang
20th-century American engineers
Members of the United States National Academy of Engineering
University of Iowa alumni
National Central University alumni
Nanjing University alumni
University of Michigan faculty
Members of Academia Sinica
Artists from Guizhou
Educators from Guizhou
Chinese seal artists
Physicists from Guizhou
Fellows of the American Physical Society